7-epi-Sesquithujene synthase (EC 4.2.3.101, TPS4-B73) is an enzyme with systematic name (2E,6E)-farnesyl-diphosphate diphosphate-lyase (7-epi-sesquithujene-forming). This enzyme catalyses the following chemical reaction

 (2E,6E)-farnesyl diphosphate  7-epi-sesquithujene + diphosphate

The enzyme from Zea mays, variety B73, gives mainly 7-epi-sesquithujene.

References

External links 
 

EC 4.2.3